Kaleh may refer to:
 Kaleh, East Azerbaijan (كله - Kaleh), Iran
 Kaleh, Hamadan (كاله - Kāleh), Iran
 Kaleh, Mazandaran (كاله - Kāleh), Iran

See also
 Kalleh (disambiguation)